The population of Puerto Rico has been shaped by native American settlement, European colonization especially under the Spanish Empire, slavery and economic migration. This article is about the demographic features of the population of Puerto Rico, including population density, ethnicity, education of the populace, health of the populace, economic status, religious affiliations and other aspects of the population.

History of migration

Sometime between 400 B.C. and A.D. 100, the Arawak group of Amerindians inhabited Puerto Rico. Around A.D. 600, the Arawaks no longer lived on the island, perhaps because they had integrated with another culture or perhaps because they had been killed by illness. By A.D. 1000, the indigenous Taíno inhabited the island. They called the island Borikén, which is popularly said to mean "land of the valiant one". This is where the alternative name for Puerto Rico, Borinquen, comes from. Since the late 18th century Puerto Ricans have called themselves some variation of boricua, borincano and borinqueño to embrace their indigenous identity. In the 15th century, the Carib lived on nearby islands and periodically invaded Taíno villages.

Immigration

The Spanish conquered the island, assuming government in 1508, colonized it, and assumed hegemony over the natives. The Taíno population dwindled due to disease, tribal warfare, and forced labor, so the Spanish began importing large numbers of slaves from Africa. Spanish men arrived on the island disproportionately to Spanish women; African and Taíno women would sometimes marry them, resulting in a mixed tri-racial ethnicity.

In the late 18th century, the number of African slaves began to dwindle on the island. The British ban on slavery resulted in slave raids on Puerto Rico. Many slaves also escaped to neighboring islands.

During the 19th century large numbers of immigrants from Spain, as well as numerous Spaniards living in former Spanish colonies in South America, also arrived in Puerto Rico (See Spanish immigration to Puerto Rico). Large numbers of Canary Islanders (Isleños) also arrived in great numbers to the island; their influence can be seen today in Puerto Rico's culture, cuisine and most notably in the variety of Spanish that is spoken in Puerto Rico.

Although the vast majority of settlers came from Spain, Catholics from France, Ireland, Corsica, Italy, Germany and other European countries were also granted land by Spain as one of the provisions of the Real Cédula de Gracias de 1815 (Royal Decree of Graces of 1815). These immigrants were allowed to settle on the island, with a certain amount of free land and enslaved persons granted to them. In return, they had to profess fealty to the Spanish Crown. During the early 20th century Jews began to settle in Puerto Rico. The first large group of Jews to settle in Puerto Rico were European refugees fleeing German–occupied Europe in the late 1930s. Puerto Rico's economic boom of the 1950s attracted a considerable number of Jewish families from the U.S. mainland, who were joined after 1959 by an influx of Jewish emigres from Fidel Castro's Cuba.

The mass immigration that occurred during the 19th century helped the population grow from 155,000 in 1800 to almost 1,000,000 at the close of the century.

Emigration
Emigration has been a major part of Puerto Rico's recent history as well. Starting in the post-World War II period waves of Puerto Ricans moved to the continental United States, particularly to New York City; Newark, Jersey City, Paterson, and Camden, New Jersey; Providence, Rhode Island; Springfield; Hartford and New Haven, Connecticut; Boston, Massachusetts; Orlando, Miami and Tampa, Florida; Philadelphia and Reading, Pennsylvania; Washington, D.C., Chicago and Los Angeles, California. This continued even as Puerto Rico's economy improved and its birth rate declined.

Vital statistics

Current vital statistics

Structure of the population
Structure of the population (01.07.2012) (Estimates) (Data refer to projections based on the 2010 Population Census):

Life expectancy 

Source: UN World Population Prospects

Race and ethnic group

Race and ethnicity

Background
In the late 1700s, Puerto Rico had laws like the Regla del Sacar or Gracias al Sacar where a person of mixed ancestry could be considered legally white so long as they could prove that at least one person per generation in the last four generations had also been legally white. Therefore, people of mixed ancestry with known white lineage were classified as white, the opposite of the "one-drop rule" in the United States.

A strong European immigration wave and large importation of slaves from Africa helped increase the population of Puerto Rico sixfold during the 19th century. No major immigration wave occurred during the 20th century.

The federal Naturalization Act, signed into law on March 26, 1790, by President Washington stated that immigrants to the United States had to be White according to the definition under the British Common Law, which the United States inherited. The legal definition of Whiteness differed greatly from White Society's informal definition, thus Jews, Romani Peoples, Middle Eastern Peoples and those of the Indian Subcontinent were before 1917 classified as White for Immigration purposes but not considered White by the society at large. The Naturalization Act of 1870, passed during Reconstruction, allowed for peoples of African descent to become U.S. Citizens but it excluded other nonwhites. The U.S. Supreme Court in the case United States v. Wong Kim Ark, 169 U.S. 649 (1898) declared that all nonwhites who were born in the United States were eligible for citizenship via the Citizenship Clause of the 14th Amendment. U.S. Immigration Policy was first restricted toward Chinese with the Chinese Exclusion Act of 1882, the Gentleman's Agreement of 1907 in which Japan voluntarily barred emigration to the United States and the Immigration Act of 1917 or the Asiatic Barred Zone which barred immigrants from all of the Middle East, the Steppes and the Orient, excluding the Philippines which was then a US Colony. European Jews and Romani, although of Asiatic Ancestry, were not affected by the Asiatic Barred Zone, as they held European Citizenship. The Johnson-Reed act of 1924 applied only to the Eastern Hemisphere. The Act imposed immigration quotas on Europe, which allowed for easy immigration from Northern and Western Europe, but almost excluded the Southern and Eastern European Nations. Africa and Asia were excluded altogether. The Western Hemisphere remained unrestricted to immigrate to the United States. Thus under the Immigration Act of 1924 all Hispanics and Caribbeans could immigrate to the United States, but a White family from Poland or Russia could not immigrate. Puerto Rican Citizenship was created under the Foraker Act, Pub.L. 56–191, 31 Stat. 77 but it wasn't until 1917 that Puerto Ricans were granted full American Citizenship under the Jones–Shafroth Act (Pub.L. 64–368, 39 Stat. 951). Puerto Ricans, excluding those of obvious African ancestry, were like most Hispanics formally classified as White under U.S. Law.

Censuses
The first census by the United States in 1899 reported a population of 953,243 inhabitants, 61.8% of them classified as white, 31.9% as mixed, and 6.3% as black.

According to the 1920 Puerto Rico census, 2,505 individuals immigrated to Puerto Rico between 1910 and 1920. Of these, 2,270 were classified as "white" in the 1920 census (1,205 from Spain, 280 from Venezuela, 180 from Cuba, and 135 from the Dominican Republic).
During the same 10-year period, 7,873 Puerto Ricans emigrated to the U.S. Of these, 6,561 were listed as "white" on the U.S mainland census, 909 as "Spanish white" and 403 as "black".

Until 1950 the U.S. Bureau of the Census attempted to quantify the racial composition of the island's population, while experimenting with various racial taxonomies. In 1960 the census dropped the racial identification question for Puerto Rico but included it again in the year 2000. The only category that remained constant over time was white, even as other racial labels shifted greatly—from "colored" to "Black", "mulatto" and "other".
Regardless of the precise terminology, the census reported that the majority of the Puerto Rican population was white from 1899 to 2000.

According to the 2015 Race and Hispanic Origin estimate (2011–2015 American Community Survey) published by the US Census Bureau, the data for Puerto Rico was as follows:
 White alone 2,495,997
 Black or African American alone 301,519
 American Indian and Alaska Native alone 11,775
 Asian alone 10,159
 Native Hawaiian and Other Pacific Islander alone 129
 Some Other Race alone 431,443
 Two or More Races 332,051
 Hispanic or Latino (of any race) 3,547,288
 White alone, Not Hispanic or Latino 24,900

In the 2020 census, the percentage of the population identifying as white dropped to 17.1%, down from 75.8% in the 2010 census. A similar drop in identification as white was seen among Hispanics in the 50 states and Washington, D.C., where the percentage of Hispanics identifying as white dropped from 53.0% to 20.3%. The change has been attributed to the wording of the Spanish-language version of the census questionnaire.

Genetic studies
Puerto Ricans, on average, have genetic contributions from Europeans, West Africans, and Native Americans of approximately 66%, 18%, and 16%, respectively.  showed 66% of Puerto Ricans could trace their ancestry to male European ancestors, 18% could trace it to male African ancestors, and 16% could trace it to male Native American ancestors.

Non-Hispanic population
In 2020, non-Hispanic residents of Puerto Rico made up 1.1% of the population, up from 1.0% in 2010. Their highest concentrations are in Culebra (10.8%), Vieques (8.0%), Rincón (5.1%), Dorado (3.4%), Luquillo (2.9%), San Juan (2.2%) Guaynabo (2.1%) and Humacao (2.0%).

Women in the diaspora
In a study done on Puerto Rican women (of all races) born on the island but living in New York by Carolina Bonilla, Mark D. Shriver and Esteban Parra in 2004, the ancestry proportions corresponding to the three parental populations were found to be 53.3±2.8% European, 29.1±2.3% West African, and 17.6±2.4% Native American based on autosomal ancestry informative markers. Although autosomal markers tests seem to draw a more broad picture than that of single, gender-based mtDNA and Y-Chromosome tests, the problem with autosomal DNA is in the archaic categories used: "European", "Sub-Saharan African", "East Asian" & "Native American".  "Asian" (South, North or East) & "North African" are not included.  These generalized categories may not take into account the complexity of migratory patterns across the Old World.  The study also found that, from the women sampled, 98% had European ancestry markers, 87% had African ancestry markers, 84% had Native American ancestry markers, 5% showed only African and European markers, 4% showed mostly Native American and European markers, 2% showed only African markers, and 2% showed mostly European markers.

Religion
There are many religious beliefs represented in the island with Christianity as the religion indicated by the majority in 2010.

Religious breakdown in Puerto Rico (2010):

Christians
A recent report providing a full breakdown as to specific religions is not available; the most recent was for 2006.

The Christian Denominational Breakdown was as follows in 2006:

Catholics
The Roman Catholic Church has been historically the most dominant religion of the majority of Puerto Ricans, with Puerto Rico having the first dioceses in the Americas. This religion was brought by Spanish colonists. The first dioceses in the Americas, including that of Puerto Rico, were authorized by Pope Julius II in 1511. One Pope, John Paul II, visited Puerto Rico in October 1984. All municipalities in Puerto Rico have at least one Catholic Church, most of which are located at the town center or "plaza".

An Associated Press article in March 2014 stated that "more than 70 percent of whom identify themselves as Catholic" but provided no source for this information. (It may have been using the 2010 Pew Research Center data.)

The CIA World Factbook however, reports that 85% of the population of Puerto Rico identifies as Roman Catholic, while 15% identify as Protestant and Other. Neither a date or a source for that information is provided and may not be recent.

In November 2014, a Pew Research report, with the sub-title Widespread Change in a Historically Catholic Region, indicated that only 56% of Puerto Ricans were Catholic and that 33% were Protestant. This survey was completed between October 2013 and February 2014.

Protestants
Protestantism in Puerto Rico was suppressed under Spanish rule. Prior to the Spanish–American War there was only one Protestant church on the island, the Holy Trinity Anglican Church, which was established in 1872 and served the British expatriate community in Ponce. The church was forbidden from ringing its bell, using its front door, or holding services in Spanish until 1898, when American troops landed in Ponce and established freedom of worship. This was the first non-Catholic church in the Spanish Empire in the Americas.

Protestantism grew under American sovereignty due to the work of American missionaries, making contemporary Puerto Rico more interconfessional than in previous centuries, although Catholicism continues to be the dominant religion.

Muslims
In 2007, there were over 5,000 Muslims in Puerto Rico, representing about 0.13% of the population. There are eight Islamic mosques spread throughout the island, with most Muslims living in Río Piedras. Puerto Rican converts to Islam continue to occur. "Ties between Latinos and Islam are more than just spiritual, but date back to Spanish history. Many people do not realize that Muslims conquered Spain". And at times not just individuals, but whole families convert.  However, lack of Muslim education in the Island forces some Puerto Rican Muslims to migrate to the States. Islam was brought into Puerto Rico mainly via the Palestinian migration of the 1950s and '60s. Thus, today there is a strong Palestinian presence among Muslims in Puerto Rico. "They are economically strong and are thus able to pay for a full-time Imaam".

Jews
Puerto Rico is also home to the largest Jewish community in the Caribbean with 3,000 Jewish inhabitants. Some Puerto Ricans have converted, not only as individuals but as entire families. Puerto Rico is the only Caribbean island in which the Conservative, Reform and Orthodox Jewish movements are represented.

Other religious practices
Taíno religious practices have been rediscovered/reinvented by a handful of advocates. Starting in about 1840, there have been attempts to create a quasi-indigenous Taíno identity in rural areas of Puerto Rico. This trend accelerated among the Puerto Rican community in the mainland United States in the 1960s. In the 2010 U.S. census, 9,399 people are identified as "Taíno."

Various African religious practices have been present since the arrival of enslaved Africans. In particular, the Yoruba beliefs of Santería and/or Ifá, and the Kongo-derived Palo Mayombe (sometimes called an African belief system, but rather a way of Bantu lifestyle of Congo origin) find adherence among the few individuals who practice some form of African traditional religion.

Demographic statistics

The following demographic statistics are from the CIA World Factbook unless otherwise indicated.

Population in 2010:
 3,725,789 (2010 U.S. Census)

Population in 2016:
 3,411,307 (Estimate)

Gender:
 Men: 1,785,171
 Women: 1,940,618

Age structure:
 0–17 years:
 24.2% (903,295)
 18–24 years:
 10.1% (375,175)
 25–34 years:
 13.2% (492,332)
 35–49 years:
 19.6% (731,514)
 50–64 years:
 18.3% (681,505)
 65 years and over:
 14.6% (541,998)

Infant mortality rate:
 Total
 8.23 deaths/1,000 live births
 Male
 Deaths/1,000 live births
 Female
 7.43 deaths/1,000 live births (2010 est.)

Life expectancy at birth:
 Total population:
 78.77 years
 Male:
 75.15 years
 Female:
 82.57 years (2010 est.)

Total fertility rate:
 1.62 children born/woman (2010 est.)

Nationality:
 Noun: Puerto Rican(s) (US citizens)
 Adjective: Puerto Rican

Ethnic Groups (2020):
 White 17.1%
 Black/African 7.0%
 Other 75.9% (includes American Indian, Alaskan Native, Native Hawaiian, Other Pacific Islander, and Others)

Religions:
 Roman Catholic 69.7%
 Protestant and Other Christian 27%

Languages:
 Spanish (main language)
 English

Median Household Income:
 $19,350 (2015 est.)

Individuals below the poverty level:
 45.5% (2015 est.)

Education, high school graduate or higher:
 73% (2015 est.)

See also 

 Puerto Rican people
 Stateside Puerto Ricans
 Puerto Rican citizenship and nationality
 Demographics of the United States
 Puerto Rican citizenship
 Outline of Puerto Rico
 Cultural diversity in Puerto Rico
 Corsican immigration to Puerto Rico
 French immigration to Puerto Rico
 Crypto-Judaism
 German immigration to Puerto Rico
 Irish immigration to Puerto Rico
 Royal Decree of Graces of 1815
 Index of Puerto Rico-related articles
 History of women in Puerto Rico
 Military history of Puerto Rico
 National Register of Historic Places listings in Puerto Rico
 Homelessness in Puerto Rico

References

Bibliography

External links
 The End of Slavery ...
 How Puerto Rico Became White: Racial analysis
 Puerto rico 2005 Fact finder statistics
 United Nations country profile
 Genetic Make-up of Puerto Ricans
 1930s Sterilization of One Third of Puerto Rican Women by the Chicago Women's Liberation Union

 
Society of Puerto Rico
Multiracial affairs in the United States
Puerto Rico